Zenith Bank Plc is a large financial service provider in Nigeria and Anglophone West Africa. It is licensed as a commercial bank by the Central Bank of Nigeria, the national banking regulator. As of 31 December 2019, it holds $16.1bn in total assets, with shareholders' equity of $854 million. The company is listed on the Nigeria Stock Exchange and the London Stock Exchange.

Founder 
The founder of Zenith bank plc is Jim Ovia.

History 
The Nigerian banking industry of the early 1990s was led by a select group of four major banks: Union Bank, First Bank, UBA , and Afribank.  In 1999, Zenith bank embraced the use of the internet for marketing financial services and to promote the use of online banking by consumers and becoming one of the earliest companies to invest in online banking. In the early 2000s, Zenith's profile began to rise, its investments in information technology helped it compete against the major banks that had a larger branch outreach and it soon began to announce net profits comparable to some of the older big banks.

On 17 June 2004, following a successful IPO, the bank became a public limited company. On 21 October 2004 its shares of the stock were listed on the Nigeria Stock Exchange (NSE). The bank's shares are traded on the London Stock Exchange (LSE) following a listing of the $850 million worth of its shares at $6.80 each, in 2013.

The bank has equity investments in Zenith Custodian, Zenith Securities, and Zenith General Insurance.

Establishment
Zenith Bank was established in May 1990 and commenced banking operations in July of the same year. At inception, it had a capital base of $4 million. It began operations during a period of government liberalization of the banking sector when the central bank granted up to twenty banking licenses a year to investors. The bank's first office was originally a residential house in Victoria Island that was modified into a banking hall. In its early years, the bank witnessed a period of rapid growth. In 1997, following a directive for banking institutions to shore up their capital base, Zenith increased its capitalization to 500 million naira.

Branch network

Zenith Bank has more than 500 branches and business offices in all states and the Federal Capital Territory.

Subsidiaries
Zenith Bank maintains subsidiaries in the United Kingdom, United Arab Emirates, Ghana, Sierra Leone and The Gambia. The Bank also has an office in China.

See also

List of banks
List of banks in Nigeria

References

External links
Zenith Bank: The success story of Nigerian banking
What Nigerian Banks Pay Their Workers - 29 July 2015.

Companies listed on the London Stock Exchange
Companies listed on the Nigerian Stock Exchange
Multinational companies based in Lagos
Banks of Nigeria
Banks established in 1990
Victoria Island, Lagos
Nigerian companies established in 1990